Robert Moreno González (born 19 September 1977) is a Spanish football manager.

He worked in youth and amateur football before becoming assistant to Luis Enrique at various clubs and the Spain national football team. In 2019, Moreno succeeded his mentor as manager of the national team and qualified for UEFA Euro 2020 before Luis Enrique returned to his post. He later managed Monaco in Ligue 1.

Coaching career

Early career
Born in L'Hospitalet de Llobregat, Barcelona, Catalonia, Moreno played as a central defender for his hometown side, La Florida CF. He started developing interest for coaching at the age of just 14, when his physical education teacher asked him to help in classes. At the age of 16, he started managing La Florida CF's Alevín squad along with Antonio Camacho.

Moreno started his professional coaching career in 2003, after being the youngest to receive the title of manager in the country, when he took charge of Penya Blaugrana Collblanc. From there he went to CE L'Hospitalet, CD Marianao Poblet, UE Castelldefels and CF Damm, managing their youth sides. In 2006, he also took over Castelldefels' first team, but was sacked in March of the following year.

After working as a scout for FC Barcelona during the 2010–11 season, Moreno worked as assistant manager under Luis Enrique at A.S. Roma (2011–2012), RC Celta de Vigo (2013–2014) and Barcelona (2014–2017). For the 2017–18 season, he assisted Juan Carlos Unzué at Celta, prior to rejoining Luis Enrique for the Spain national team in July 2018.

Spain national team
On 26 March 2019, Moreno was in charge of the national team in a 2–0 win against Malta after Luis Enrique had to leave due to personal problems. He was also in charge during the following two matches, against the Faroe Islands and Sweden.

After three matches in charge of Spain on an interim basis, Moreno was appointed the team's head coach on 19 June 2019, after Luis Enrique's resignation due to his daughter's illness. He signed a contract until the end of UEFA Euro 2020. Only five months later, Moreno resigned and was replaced by his predecessor Luis Enrique despite an unbeaten record and qualifying for UEFA Euro 2020. Luis Enrique dismissed Moreno from his coaching staff and called him "disloyal" and "over ambitious" for wanting to manage Spain at Euro 2020.

Monaco
On 28 December 2019, Moreno was named as the new manager of Ligue 1 side AS Monaco FC, replacing Leonardo Jardim. A week later, he won his first match 2–1 at home to Reims in the last 64 of the Coupe de France. On 12 January in his first league match, the team from the principality drew 3–3 at leaders Paris Saint-Germain FC.

Having finished the season in 9th, missing out on European qualification, Moreno was sacked on 18 July 2020.

Granada
On 18 June 2021, La Liga club Granada CF announced Moreno as the side's new head coach on a two-year contract. He drew 0–0 at Villarreal CF on his debut on 16 August.

On 6 March 2022, Moreno was sacked by the Andalusians, after six defeats in the last seven matches.

Managerial statistics

References

External links

1977 births
Living people
Sportspeople from L'Hospitalet de Llobregat
Spanish football managers
CE L'Hospitalet managers
Spain national football team managers
AS Monaco FC managers
Granada CF managers
Ligue 1 managers
La Liga managers
Spanish expatriate football managers
Spanish expatriate sportspeople in Monaco
Expatriate football managers in Monaco
Spanish expatriate sportspeople in Italy
A.S. Roma non-playing staff
FC Barcelona non-playing staff
RC Celta de Vigo non-playing staff